NGC 5964 is a  barred spiral galaxy in the constellation Serpens Caput. NGC 5964 is also known by the names IC 4551 and PGC 55637.

NGC 5964 has relatively unwound spiral arms; it lacks the clear defined spiral arms the Milky Way galaxy has. The central bar is very small, long and thin. NGC 5964 thus does not have a galactic habitable zone like the Milky Way. For the Milky Way, the galactic habitable zone is commonly believed to be an annulus with an outer radius of about 10 kiloparsecs and an inner radius close to the Galactic Center, both of which lack hard boundaries.

References

External links

Barred spiral galaxies
Serpens (constellation)
5964
55637
09935